Alfred Coleman may refer to:
 Alfred Coleman (cricketer)
 Alfred Coleman (artist)